Atascadero Lake is a 30-acre reservoir in San Luis Obispo County, California. Along with Parole Canyon, it is one of two major drainages of the Atascadero Creek - Mid Salinas watershed.

References 

Lakes of San Luis Obispo County, California
Atascadero, California